Claudy is a village and townland (of 1,154 acres) in County Londonderry, Northern Ireland. It is situated in the civil parish of Cumber Upper and the historic barony of Tirkeeran. It is also part of Derry and Strabane district.

Claudy had a population of 1,336 people in the 2011 census. It has two primary schools, two churches and a college named St Patrick's and St. Brigid's College.

History
During the Troubles in Northern Ireland, 13 people were killed in or near the village of Claudy. Nine of these people all civilians, including a nine-year-old child, were killed in the Claudy bombing of 31 July 1972, in which three suspected Provisional Irish Republican Army (IRA) car bombs exploded almost simultaneously in Main Street. Inadequate warning was given, and no paramilitary group has ever admitted responsibility for the bombing. Of the other four people to be killed in Claudy, three were Protestant members of the security forces (two Ulster Defence Regiment and one Royal Ulster Constabulary), and all were killed by the IRA in separate incidents. The other person to be killed was a Catholic civilian killed by the Ulster Freedom Fighters. All 13 victims were killed during a relatively brief period, from 1972 to 1976.

Because of Claudy's small population, it has one of Northern Ireland's higher Troubles-related fatality rates. The 13 people killed there in the Troubles are equivalent to one percent of the village's 2001 population; in comparison, the death rate in Belfast was equivalent to just over half a percent of the city's 2001 population, and that in Derry a quarter of a percent.

Sport
Claudy has a local Gaelic Athletic Association club, Claudy GAC.
Claudy is home to two rival football clubs, Claudy United and Claudy Rovers.
The village also has a local leisure centre called the Diamond Centre. It has sporting, gym, and ICT facilities.

Demography

2011 census
In the 2011 census, Claudy had a population of 1,340 people (504 households).
	
On census day 27 March 2011, in Claudy Settlement, considering the resident population:
 
 99.10% were from the white (including Irish Traveller) ethnic group;
 80.45% belong to or were brought up in the Catholic religion and 17.39% belong to or were brought up in a 'Protestant and Other Christian (including Christian related)' religion; and
 22.24% indicated that they had a British national identity, 50.45% had an Irish national identity and 31.04% had a Northern Irish national identity.

2001 census
Claudy is classified as a village by the Northern Ireland Statistics and Research Agency (NISRA) (i.e. with population between 1,000 and 2,250 people). On Census day (29 April 2001) there were 1,316 people living in Claudy. Of these:
26.7% were aged under 16 and 12.3% were aged 60 and over
49.1% of the population were male and 50.9% were female
77.9% were from a Catholic background and 21.4% were from a Protestant background
4.9% of people aged 16–74 were unemployed

Education
St. Patrick's and St. Brigid's College
Cumber Claudy Primary School
St Colmcilles Primary School and Nursery Unit

NIMDM deprivation 2005
Of 582 wards in Northern Ireland, Claudy is ranked 241st.

See also 
List of towns and villages in Northern Ireland
List of townlands in County Londonderry

References

External links

Civil parish of Cumber Upper
Derry and Strabane district
Townlands of County Londonderry
Villages in County Londonderry